Rhamphomyia crassirostris is a species of dance flies, in the fly family Empididae. It is found in most of Europe, east to Poland and Hungary. It is absent from Italy and the Balkan Peninsula.

References

External links
Fauna Europaea

Rhamphomyia
Asilomorph flies of Europe
Insects described in 1816